Uncertain is the first EP by the Irish band the Cranberries. Produced by Pearse Gilmore, it was released in the autumn of 1991, with the band having previously released cassette EPs under the name The Cranberry Saw Us. Uncertain was released by Island under the Xeric Records name on both CD and 12" vinyl formats. Approximately 5,000 total copies of Uncertain were produced. Guitarist Noel Hogan said of the album that Gilmore "cluttered the mixes with dance beats and industrial-style guitar", which resulted from a conflictual relationship between the group and Gilmore. The EP did not chart.

An unreleased music video was made for the main theme "Uncertain"; a brief part of the clip was included on their DVD compilation, Stars: The Best of 1992–2002. The unedited complete video clip appeared for the first time on YouTube on 14 April 2020, and shows a young Dolores O'Riordan, with her brother Brendan and his daughter Cora, recalling her days as a child in an Irish forest.

Television performance
After the release of 'Uncertain', The Cranberries appeared on the Irish television show "On The Waterfront" which was hosted by Robert Arkins and Felim Gormley from The Commitments. They performed "Linger", which was recorded and was broadcast in 1992.

Track listing

References

1991 EPs
The Cranberries albums